A pickup truck or pickup is a light-duty truck that has an enclosed cabin, and a back end made up of a cargo bed that is enclosed by three low walls with no roof (this cargo bed back end sometimes consists of a tailgate and removable covering). In Australia and New Zealand, both pickups and coupé utilities are called utes, short for utility vehicle. In South Africa, people of all language groups use the term bakkie, a diminutive of bak, Afrikaans for "basket".

Once a work or farming tool with few creature comforts, in the 1950s U.S. consumers began purchasing pickups for lifestyle reasons, and by the 1990s, less than 15% of owners reported use in work as the pickup truck's primary purpose. In North America, the pickup is mostly used as a passenger car and accounts for about 18% of total vehicles sold in the United States. Full-sized pickups and SUVs are an important source of revenue for major car manufacturers such as GM, Ford, and Stellantis's Ram Trucks Division, accounting for more than two-thirds of their global pretax earnings, though they make up just 16% of North American vehicle production. These vehicles have a high profit margin and a high price tag; in 2018, Kelley Blue Book cited an average cost (including optional features) of US$47,174 for a new Ford F-150.

The term pickup is of unknown origin. It was used by Studebaker in 1913 and by the 1930s, "pick-up" (hyphenated) had become the standard term.

History

In the early days of automobile manufacturing, vehicles were sold as a chassis only, and third parties added bodies on top. In 1902, the Rapid Motor Vehicle Company was founded by Max Grabowsky and Morris Grabowsky who built one-ton carrying capacity trucks in Pontiac, Michigan. In 1913, the Galion Allsteel Body Company, an early developer of the pickup and dump truck, built and installed hauling boxes on slightly modified Ford Model T chassis, and from 1917 on the Model TT. Seeking part of this market share, Dodge introduced a 3/4-ton pickup with cab and body constructed entirely of wood in 1924. In 1925, Ford followed up with a Model T-based, steel-bodied, half-ton with an adjustable tailgate and heavy-duty rear springs. In 1928, it was replaced by the Model A, which had a closed-cab, safety-glass windshield, roll-up side windows, and three-speed transmission.

In 1931, GM introduced light-duty pickups for both GMC and Chevrolet targeted at private ownership. These pickup trucks were based on the Chevrolet Master. In 1940, GM introduced the dedicated light-truck platform, separate from passenger cars, which GM named the AK series. Ford North America continued to offer a pickup body style on the Ford Model 51, and the Ford Australian division produced the first Australian "ute" in 1932. In 1940, Ford offered a dedicated light-duty truck platform called the Ford F100, then upgraded the platform after World War II to the Ford F-Series in 1948.

Dodge at first assumed heavier truck production from Graham-Paige, while the company produced their own light (pickup) trucks, initially on their sufficiently sturdy passenger car frames. But after switching to distinct, dedicated truck frames in 1936, Dodge/Fargo launched an extensive own truck range for 1939, marketed as the 'Job-Rated' trucks. These Art-Deco styled trucks were again continued after WW II.

International Harvester offered the International K and KB series, which were marketed towards construction and farming and did not have a strong retail consumer presence, and Studebaker also manufactured the M-series truck. At the beginning of World War II, the United States government halted the production of privately owned pickup trucks, and all American manufacturers built heavy duty trucks for the war effort.

In the 1950s, consumers began purchasing pickups for lifestyle rather than utilitarian reasons. Car-like, smooth-sided, fenderless trucks were introduced, such as the Chevrolet Fleetside, the Chevrolet El Camino, the Dodge Sweptline, and in 1957, Ford's purpose-built Styleside. Pickups began to feature comfort items such as power options and air conditioning. During this time, pickups with four doors, known as a crew cab, started to become popular. These pickup trucks were released in 1954 in Japan with the Toyota Stout, in 1957 in Japan with the Datsun 220, and in 1957 in America with the International Travelette. Other manufactures soon followed, including the Hino Briska in 1962, Dodge in 1963, Ford in 1965, and General Motors in 1973.

In 1963, the U.S. chicken tax directly curtailed the import of the Volkswagen Type 2, distorting the market in favor of U.S. manufacturers. The tariff directly affected any country seeking to bring light trucks into the United States and effectively "squeezed smaller Asian truck companies out of the American pickup market." Over the intervening years, Detroit lobbied to protect the light-truck tariff, thereby reducing pressure on Detroit to introduce vehicles that polluted less and that offered increased fuel economy.

The U.S. government's 1973 Corporate Average Fuel Economy (CAFE) policy set higher fuel-economy requirements for cars than pickups. CAFE led to the replacement of the station wagon by the minivan, the latter of which belonged in the truck category, which allowed it compliance with less strict emissions standards. Eventually, CAFE led to the promotion of sport utility vehicles (SUVs). Pickups, unhindered by the emissions controls regulations on cars, began to replace muscle cars as the performance vehicle of choice. The Dodge Warlock appeared in Dodge's "adult toys" line, along with the Macho Power Wagon and Street Van. The 1978 gas guzzler tax, which taxed fuel-inefficient cars while exempting pickup trucks, further distorted the market in favor of pickups. Furthermore, until 1999, light trucks were not required to meet the same safety standards as cars and 20 years later most still lagged behind cars in the adoption of safety features.

In the 1980s, the compact Mazda B-series, Isuzu Faster, and Mitsubishi Forte appeared. Subsequently, U.S. manufacturers built their own compact pickups for the domestic market, including the Ford Ranger, and the Chevrolet S-10. Minivans make inroads into the pickups' market share. In the 1990s, pickups' market share was further eroded by the popularity of SUVs.

Mid-sized electric trucks had been tried early in the 20th century but soon lost out to gasoline and diesel vehicles. In 1997 the Chevrolet S-10 EV was released, but few were sold, and those were mostly to fleet operators.

By 2023, pickup trucks had become strictly more lifestyle than utilitarian vehicles. Annual surveys of Ford F-150 owners from 2012 to 2021 revealed that 87% of the owners used their trucks frequently for shopping and running errands and 70% for pleasure driving, whereas 28% used their trucks often for personal hauling (41% occasionally and 32% rarely/never) and only 7% used them for towing while 29% only did so occasionally and 63% rarely/never did. A 1960s-1970s Ford F-100 was typically regular cab and consisted of mostly 64% bed and 36% cab, while by mid-2000s, crew cabs were largely becoming the norm and the bed was shrunk to accommodate the larger cab, and a 2023 F-150 consisted of 63% cab and 37% bed.

International markets
While the Ford F-150 has been the best-selling vehicle in the United States since 1982, the Ford F-150, or indeed any full-sized pickup truck, is a rare sight in Europe, where high fuel prices and narrow city roads make it difficult to use daily. In the United States, pickups are favored by a cultural attachment to the style, low fuel prices, and taxes and regulations that distort the market in favor of domestically built trucks. As of 2016, the IRS offers tax breaks for business use of "any vehicle equipped with a cargo area ... of at least six feet in interior length that is not readily accessible from the passenger compartment".

In Europe, pickups represent less than 1% of light vehicles sold, the most popular being the Ford Ranger with 27,300 units sold in 2015. Other models include the Renault Alaskan (a rebadged Nissan Navara), and the Toyota Hilux.

The NOx law and other differing regulations prevent pickups from being imported to Japan, but the Japanese Domestic Market Mitsubishi Triton was available for a limited time. The most recent pickup truck on sale in Japan is the Toyota Hilux.

In China (where it is known by the English loanword as 皮卡车 pí kǎ chē), the Great Wall Wingle is manufactured domestically and exported to Australia. In Thailand, pickups manufactured for local sale and export include the Isuzu D-Max and the Mitsubishi Triton. In Latin and South America, the Toyota Hilux, Ford Ranger, VW Amarok, Dodge Ram, Chevrolet S-10, Chevrolet D-20, and Chevrolet Montana are sold.

In South Africa, pickups account for about 17% of the passenger and light commercial vehicle sales, mostly the Toyota Hilux, Ford Ranger, and Isuzu KB (Isuzu D-Max). The Volkswagen Amarok and Nissan Navara are also sold.

Design and features

In the United States and Canada, nearly all new pickups are sold with automatic transmissions. Only the Jeep Gladiator and the Toyota Tacoma are available with manual transmissions.

A regular cab has a single row of seats and a single set of doors, one on each side.

Extended or super cab pickups add an extra space behind the main seat, sometimes including smaller "jump" seats. The first extended cab truck in the United States was called the Club Cab and was introduced by Chrysler in 1973 on Dodge pickup trucks. Modern extended cab trucks have a set of small rear doors that are rear-hinged, such as the Ford F-series and Nissan Titan, and they can only be opened after the front doors are open. Other modern extended-cab trucks have small conventional rear doors such as the Ram Pickup and Toyota Tundra.

A crew cab, or double cab, seats five or six and has four full-sized, front-hinged doors. The first crew cab truck in the United States was made by International Harvester in 1957, and was later followed by Dodge in 1963, Ford in 1965, and Chevrolet in 1973.

Cab-over or cab forward designs have the cab sitting above the front axle. This arrangement allows a longer cargo area for the same overall length. An early cab-forward, drop-sided pickup was the Volkswagen Transporter, introduced in 1952. This configuration is more common among European and Japanese manufacturers than in North America. The design was more popular in North America in the 1950s and '60s, with examples including the Chevrolet Corvair Rampside and Loadside, Dodge A-100 and A-108, Ford Econoline, and Jeep FC-150 and FC-170.

The cargo bed can vary in size according to whether the vehicle is optimized for cargo utility or passenger comfort. Most have fixed side walls and a hinged tailgate. Cargo beds are normally found in two styles: step side or fleet side. A step-side bed has fenders that extend on the outside of the cargo area. A fleet-side bed has wheel wells inside the bed. The first fleet-sided truck was the 1955 Chevrolet Cameo Carrier. Early trucks had wood-plank beds, which were largely replaced by steel by the 1960s. Some European-style trucks use a drop-sided bed with a flat tray with hinged panels rising up on the sides and the rear.

A "dually" is a North American colloquial term for a pickup with four rear wheels instead of two, able to carry more weight over the rear axle. Vehicles similar to the pickup include the coupé utility, a car-based pickup, and the larger sport utility truck (SUT), based on a sport utility vehicle (SUV).

The terms half-ton and three-quarter-ton are remnants from a time when the number referred to the maximum cargo capacity by weight.

The last time Chevrolet and GMC used the Stepside style was on the 2007 Silverado and Sierra Classic models. Ford last used the Flareside style in the 2009 F-150.

Uses

In the United States and Canada, pickups are used primarily for passenger transport. Pickup trucks are often marketed and used for their hauling (utilizing cargo bed) and towing (utilizing body on frame design and long wheelbase) capabilities.

Pickup trucks are also used by many journeymen, tradesmen, and outdoor enthusiasts. They are also used to move or transport large goods. For example, in the U.S., a homeowner can rent a pickup truck to transport a large appliance from a home supply store.

Equipping pickup trucks with camper shells provides a small living space for camping. Slide-in truck campers, though, give a pickup truck the amenities of a small motorhome, but still allow the operator the option of removal and independent use of the vehicle.

Modified pickups can be used as improvised, unarmoured combat vehicles called technicals.

Pickup trucks are used to carry passengers in parts of Africa and Southeast Asia. In Thailand, most songthaews are converted pickup trucks and flatbed trucks. In Haiti, tap taps are also converted pickup trucks.

Gallery

See also
 Coupe utility
 Flatbed truck
 Kei truck
 List of pickup trucks
 Panel van
 Pickup truck racing, a form of auto racing using modified versions of pickups mostly on oval tracks
 Roadster utility
 Rolling coal: some pickups are modified to produce more diesel exhaust. Modifications may cost from $2,000 to $5,000.
 Self-driving truck
 Truck classification
 Ute

References

External links 
 

Car classifications
 
Light trucks